Foxborough is a town in Norfolk County, Massachusetts, United States, about  southwest of Boston,  northeast of Providence, Rhode Island and about  northwest of Cape Cod. The population was 18,618 at the 2020 census.

"Foxborough" is the official spelling of the town name per local government, but the abbreviated spelling "Foxboro" is common and is used by the United States Postal Service. 

Foxborough is best known as the site of Gillette Stadium, home of the New England Patriots of the National Football League (NFL) and the New England Revolution of Major League Soccer (MLS).

History

Settled in 1704 and incorporated in 1778, the town of Foxborough was named for Charles James Fox, a Whig member of Parliament and a staunch supporter of the Colonies in the years leading up to the American Revolution.

The town was once home to the world's largest straw hat factory. Founded by local businessman E.P. Carpenter, the Union Straw Works burned to the ground in the early 20th century. The town post office now stands on the site.

Foxborough was composed of small neighborhood communities until the early 1900s. These included Foxvale/Paineburgh, which remained semi-independent until the early twentieth century; Quaker Hill in South Foxborough; and Lakeview/Donkeyville in West Foxborough.

Schaefer Stadium (later known as Sullivan Stadium, then Foxboro Stadium) opened in 1971 as the home of the New England Patriots, after the football team spent its first eleven seasons playing at various stadiums in Boston. The family of Billy Sullivan owned both the Patriots and the stadium until they sold the team in 1988. The stadium, however, lapsed into bankruptcy and was then bought by paper magnate Robert Kraft. With Kraft in control of Foxboro Stadium, he prevented the Patriots from relocating to St. Louis in 1994 by refusing to let the team break their lease, then bought the Patriots outright. Kraft then founded the New England Revolution, one of the charter clubs of Major League Soccer, in 1996.

Gillette Stadium opened in 2002 as a replacement for Foxboro Stadium. The Patriot Place shopping plaza, built on land surrounding the stadium bought by Kraft, completed construction in 2009. The plaza includes a variety of restaurants, clothing stores, and other retailers. 

Foxborough hosted multiples matches during the 1994 FIFA World Cup at Foxborough Stadium and will do so again during the 2026 FIFA World Cup at Gillette Stadium.

Geography

Foxborough is located at  (42.065248, –71.247856).

For the purposes of the United States Census Bureau, the built-up central area of Foxborough known as the Foxborough Census Designated Place (CDP) has a total area of 7.6 km2 (3.0 mi2). 7.5 km2 (2.9 mi2) is land and 0.1 km2 (0.1 mi2) (1.69%) is water.

Climate

Foxborough's climate is humid continental (Köppen: Dfa) with four distinct seasons, which is the predominant climate for Massachusetts and New England. Summers are typically warm to hot, rainy, and humid, while winters are cold, windy, and snowy. Spring and fall are usually mild, but conditions are widely varied, depending on wind direction and jet stream positioning. The warmest month is July, with an average high temperature of 83 °F and an average low temperature of 62 °F. The coldest month is January, with an average high temperature of 36 °F and an average low temperature of 18 °F. Periods exceeding 90 °F in summer and below 10 °F in winter are not uncommon but rarely extended, with about 14 days per year seeing the former extreme. Because of the town's relatively short distance from the Atlantic Ocean, temperatures tend to remain warmer than locations further inland. Like the rest of the northeastern seaboard, precipitation is distributed fairly evenly throughout the entire year, with the winter months receiving slightly more precipitation than the summer months. Powerful storm systems known as Nor'easters can produce heavy amounts of rain and snow at any time of the year, but these storms most often strike during the winter months, causing significant snowfall amounts and blizzard conditions. Thunderstorms occur somewhat frequently in the summer, occasionally bringing heavy downpours, damaging winds, and hail. Tornado activity is relatively low in the area, although there have been a fair share of tornado warnings issued over the years. Due to its location along the United States eastern seaboard, Foxborough is somewhat vulnerable to Atlantic hurricanes and tropical storms that threaten the region from late summer into early autumn.

Demographics

Entire town

As of the census of 2000, there were 16,246 people, 6,141 households, and 4,396 families residing in the town. The racial makeup of the town was 97.09% White, 0.82% Black or African American, 0.11% Native American, 1.22% Asian, 0.01% Pacific Islander, 0.20% from other races, and 0.54% from two or more races. Hispanic or Latino people of any race were 1.06% of the population.

There were 6,141 households, out of which 35.3% had children under the age of 18 living with them, 59.9% were married couples living together, 8.6% had a female householder with no husband present, and 28.4% were non-families. Of all households 23.4% were made up of individuals, and 8.6% had someone living alone who was 65 years of age or older.  The average household size was 2.63 and the average family size was 3.15.

In the town, 26.5% of the population was under the age of 18, 5.0% was from 18 to 24, 32.1% from 25 to 44, 24.5% from 45 to 64, and 11.9% were 65 years of age or older.  The median age was 38 years. For every 100 females, there were 95.8 males.  For every 100 females age 18 and over, there were 92.2 males.

The median income for a household in the town was $64,323, and the median income for a family was $78,811. Based on data from the 2007–2011 American Community Survey 5-Year Estimates, these figures have risen to $92,370 as the median income for a household in the town and $108,209 as the median income for a family. Males had a median income of $51,901 versus $35,748 for females. The per capita income for the town was $32,294, but this figure has risen to $42,236. About 2.3% of families and 3.1% of the population were below the poverty line, including 2.0% of those under age 18 and 6.2% of those age 65 or over.

Foxborough CDP

The built-up central business district is designated by the United States Census Bureau as the Foxborough Census Designated Place for record keeping purposes (this is common among many larger population New England towns).

As of the census of 2000, there were 5,509 people, 2,486 households, and 1,372 families residing in the CDP. The population density was 730.9/km2 (1,895.7/mi2). There were 2,576 housing units at an average density of 341.8/km2 (886.4/mi2). The racial makeup of the CDP was 96.57% White, 1.42% Black or African American, 0.13% Native American, 1.07% Asian, 0.29% from other races, and 0.53% from two or more races. Hispanic or Latino people of any race were 1.60% of the population.

There were 2,486 households, out of which 25.9% had children under the age of 18 living with them, 41.9% were married couples living together, 9.5% had a female householder with no husband present, and 44.8% were non-families. Of all households 37.8% were made up of individuals, and 13.6% had someone living alone who was 65 years of age or older. The average household size was 2.18 and the average family size was 2.95.

In the CDP, 21.7% of the population was under the age of 18, 5.3% was from 18 to 24, 35.0% from 25 to 44, 21.6% from 45 to 64, and 16.4% were 65 years of age or older. The median age was 38 years. For every 100 females, there were 92.1 males. For every 100 females age 18 and over, there were 87.6 males.

The median income for a household in the CDP was $50,431, and the median income for a family was $58,924. Males had a median income of $42,030 versus $35,370 for females. The per capita income for the CDP was $31,245. About 4.1% of families and 5.1% of the population were below the poverty line, including 5.4% of those under age 18 and 8.7% of those age 65 or over.

Government

Foxborough is run by a five-member board of selectmen and elected town officials like the town moderator and town clerk. Day-to-day operations involving items under the Board of Selectmen's purview is handled by an appointed Town Manager.

Board of Selectmen (term ends)
Mark Elfman, Chairman (2022)
Ed O'Leary, Vice-chairman (2022)
Stephanie McGowan, Clerk (2023)
Leah Gibson (2022)
Chris Mitchell (2021)

Other town officials
William G. Keegan Jr. (Town Manager)
Michael Johns (Assistant Town Manager)
Robert E. Cutler Jr. (Town Clerk)
Peter Solbo (Highway Supervisor)
Christopher Gallagher (Department of Public Works)
Paige Duncan (Town Planner)
Mark Dupell (Building Commissioner)
Pauline Zajdel (Health Agent)
Jane Sears Pierce (Conservation Manager)
Bob Boette (Conservation Commission Chairman)
Robert B. Worthley (Water and Sewer Superintendent)
George G. Samia (Finance Director)
Michael P. Kelleher (Fire Chief)
Michael A. Grace (Police Chief)
Ally Rodriguez (Veteran's Agent)
Mark Ferencik (Historical Commission Chairman)
Deborah Giardino (Recreation Director)
Hannelore Simonds (Chief Assessor)
Manuel Leite (Library Director)
Amy Berdos (Superintendent of Schools)

The Town Hall is located at 40 South Street, Foxborough, MA 02035.

Education

Public schools
Foxborough has a public school system. The Foxborough Public Schools (FPS) district currently has an enrollment of over 3,000 children in grades from preschool to grade 12.

Foxborough public schools:
 Charles G. Taylor Elementary School (K–4)
 Vincent M. Igo Elementary School (Pre-K–4)
 Mabelle M. Burrell Elementary School (K–4)
 John J. Ahern Middle School (5–8)
 Foxborough High School (9–12)

Foxborough High School offers a wide variety of sports including golf, track and field, football, soccer, cross country, volleyball, swim, basketball, wrestling, hockey, indoor track, cheerleading, lacrosse, baseball, tennis, and softball.

The mascot of the high school is the Warriors, whose colors are blue and gold. Foxborough's rival is neighboring Mansfield High School.

The football team has won the Hockomock League title and won the Division 2 Super Bowl various times, most recently in 2007 with a 21–10 victory over Burlington. The Super Bowl win was coach Jack Martinelli's 200th win. During the 1987 and 1988 seasons, the Warriors won back-to-back Division 3 Super Bowls and went undefeated in 1988. This team featured five players who went on to play Division 1 college football (Chris Cady, Eric Matckie, Tom Nalen, Dan Sullivan, and Rob Turenne).

The cheerleading team has also earned recognition, making it to nationals for the first time in 2004 and again in 2005, 2006, 2007 and 2008.

The golf team has produced many all-scholastic players and state champions, as has the wrestling team. The boys' indoor track team were the Hockomock Champions in the 2006/2007 season. The field hockey team have been the Hockomock Champions several times in recent years.

Foxborough High School is also known for its music program, which includes a string orchestra, symphony orchestra, chorus, marching band, concert band, symphonic winds, winds ensemble and jazz band/choir. Many of these groups regularly place in competitions, but the Jazz Ensemble has been recognized in several Essentially Ellington competitions. The top 15 jazz bands in the country send in recordings of themselves for judging. Foxborough has placed in the top 15 for several years.

Private schools

Foxborough Regional Charter School (FRCS) is a public, college preparatory school for grades K–12.
The Sage School is a private school for gifted learners in pre-kindergarten through 8th grade.

Points of interest

 Foxboro Grange Hall – a National Historic Register place, added in 1983
 Gillette Stadium – home of the New England Patriots and the New England Revolution
 Patriot Place – an outdoor shopping and entertainment complex next to Gillette Stadium
 F. Gilbert Hills State Forest – Encompassing  in Foxborough and Wrentham, the state forest is used for hiking, biking, cross country skiing, horseback riding, and observing nature. Contained on state forest land are some unique stone structures that some believe were made and used by the native Algonquin tribes prior to the town's founding.
Memorial Hall – a stone building and monument in the center of town, formerly housing the library, now dedicated to those who served in the armed forces, containing a permanent collection of historical artifacts relating to town history

Notable people

 Sam Berns, inspiring teenager who was born with progeria
 Seth Boyden, born in Foxborough, later became one of Newark, New Jersey's foremost citizen-inventors, responsible for inventing patent leather, malleable iron and other processes as well as one of the first to develop daguerreotype
 Frank Boyden, headmaster of Deerfield Academy
 Jeremy Collins, winner of Survivor: Cambodia
 Anna Conway, painter based in New York City
 Rob Gronkowski, former tight end for the New England Patriots, partner of model Camille Kostek
 Calvin R. Johnson, member of the Wisconsin State Assembly
 JoJo, born Joanna Levesque, an R&B singer-songwriter and actress
 Camille Kostek, model who was on the cover of the Sports Illustrated Swimsuit Issue, partner of football player Rob Gronkowski
 Tim Lefebvre, bassist who plays with Tedeschi Trucks Band and played bass on David Bowie's final album Blackstar
 Tom Nalen, former professional football player for the Denver Broncos
 Nothing,Nowhere, born Joe Mulherin, rapper and singer
 Sidney Lawton Smith, designer, etcher, engraver, illustrator, and bookplate artist
 Chris Sullivan, musician, actor, cast member of The Electric Company
 Nguyen Van Thieu, president of South Vietnam 1967–1975
 Madame Nguyen Van Thieu, the last serving First Lady of South Vietnam, 1967–1975
 Seth Williams, Marine Corps officer, Quartermaster General of the United States Marine Corps 1937–1944

References

External links

 Town of Foxborough
 Foxborough Historical Society

 
1704 establishments in Massachusetts
Populated places established in 1704
Towns in Massachusetts
Towns in Norfolk County, Massachusetts